The 2022 Women's Bandy World Championship was an international bandy tournament for women and the 11th (XI) Women's Bandy World Championship organized by the Federation of International Bandy (FIB). The event was contested from 23 to 27 March 2022 in Åby, Sweden.

Due to the Russian invasion of Ukraine, Team Russia withdrew from the tournament and although the Ukraine women's national bandy team was scheduled to participate, they had to withdraw. Team Ukraine's appearance was meant to be the Ukrainian women's bandy world debut, almost a century after women's bandy teams were first recorded to have appeared in Kharkiv, Ukraine, in 1927.

The Great Britain women's national bandy team made its first international appearance at the 2022 world championship after its initial attempt to compete at the 2014 Women's Bandy World Championship had failed to materialize.

The 2023 Women's Bandy World Championship will be hosted in late March and early April again in Åby in Växjö, Sweden, alongside the men's 2023 Bandy World Championship.

History
According to the Federation of International Bandy (FIB), the competition was postponed from its initial start date due to organizing problems in Sweden. It was initially planned to be held in Stockholm, Sweden, January 9-16, 2022 at the newly built Gubbängen's Skating and Bandy Arena (Bandyhallen i Gubbängen in Swedish). The tournament was to be the first Women's Bandy World Championship to be played indoors and still was after the change of venue.

The new date for the 2022 Women's Bandy World Championship was set for March 23-27, 2022. The Russian team withdrew and the Ukraine team had to withdraw due to the 2022 Russian invasion of Ukraine.

Venues

The 2022 Women's Bandy World Championships took place in Åby, a small community north of Växjö, in southern Sweden about 400 kilometers south of Stockholm.

The tournament was held at the Eriksson Arena a newly built bandy arena⁣ which was completed in 2019. Åby/Tjureda IF, a team in the Bandyallsvenskan, the Swedish second division, normally plays there.

Squads 

Each team had a maximum of 16 players and 4 leaders.

Referees 
There were three main referees: Victoria Bergström (Sweden), Stephanie Johnson (USA) and Ida Salomonsson (Sweden).

There were also six assistant referees: Elisabeth Englund, Siri Hansson, Hanna Hansson, Samuel Pettersson, Andreas Pettersson and Hannah Pettersson.

Pool A 

All games 2 x 45 minutes.

Group stage

Knockout stage

Bracket

Semifinals

Bronze game

Final

Pool B 

All games 2 x 30 minutes.

Group stage

Knockout stage

Bracket

Semifinals

Bronze game

Final

Final ranking

Awards 

 MVP:
 Best goalkeeper:
 Best defender:
 Best midfielder:
 Best forward:
 Fair play:

References

Women's Bandy World Championship
World
Bandy
2022 in Swedish sport
International bandy competitions hosted by Sweden
Bandy World Championship
Bandy